Guidet is a surname. Notable people with the surname include:

Abel Guidet (1890–1944), French politician
Henri Guidet (1912–1982), French politician